The 2022 Rugby Football League Championship is a rugby league football competition played in England. It is the second tier of the three tiers of professional rugby league in England, below Super League, and above League 1. The sponsors for the league are the bookmakers, Betfred and the league will continue to be known as the Betfred Championship.

The league was won by Leigh Centurions who beat Batley Bulldogs 44–12 in the Grand Final to win promotion to Super League in 2023. Leigh also won the league leaders shield by finishing top of the regular season league table. Dewsbury Rams and Workington Town were relegated from the Championship to play in the 2023 League One.

Rule changes
The RFL approved three rules changes for 2022. On 20 January 2022, The RFL confirmed that scrums will return to all competitions, having been suspended as part of the game's COVID-19 response in 2020 and 2021. Scrums are only being reintroduced for errors (knock-on, forward pass or accidental offside) in the first four tackles of a set. Other cases, where previously a scrum would have been awarded, for example - ball into touch on the full, ball kicked or passed into touch, incorrect play the ball; will result in a handover. 

The ball steal law will revert to the 2020 rule where the ball can only be stolen in a one-on-one tackle and not during a multi-person tackle where the additional tacklers have peeled off the tackle before the steal. Finally, injured players will be required to leave the pitch for treatment, if possible, following complaints that stoppages for injury spoil the speed and flow of the game.

Teams
The league comprised 14 teams.  The regular season comprised 27 rounds, each teams will play each of the others twice (home and away) with the 21st round, the Summer Bash, seeing seven additional fixtures between the 14 teams played at the same venue, which this year was Headingley stadium in Leeds.

Fixtures and results

Regular season table

End of season awards

Foundation of the year: Sheffield Eagles
Club of the year: Barrow Raiders
Coach of the year: Paul Crarey (Barrow Raiders)
Young player of the year: Sam Eseh (Featherstone Rovers)
Player of the year: Edwin Ipape (Leigh Centurions)

Play-offs

The same play-off structure as used in 2021 was used.

Team bracket

Summary

Broadcasting
The rights to show matches from the Championship was until November 2020 held by Sky TV but the RFL negotiated a new deal with Sky which removed Championship games from the existing contract, and instead the RFL signed a new deal with Premier Sports. This deal resulted in one match from each round being broadcast live on a Monday evening.

References

Rugby Football League Championship
2022 in English rugby league